The flag of Macau, officially the regional flag of the Macau Special Administrative Region of the People's Republic of China is light green with a lotus flower above the stylised Governador Nobre de Carvalho Bridge and water in white, beneath a circular arc of five golden five-pointed stars: one large star in the center of the arc with two smaller stars on each side of the large star, each with a point angled directly outward from the center of the common circle on which they lie.

The lotus was chosen as the floral emblem of Macau. The Governor Nobre de Carvalho Bridge is a bridge linking the Macau Peninsula and the island of Taipa. The bridge is one of the most recognisable landmarks for the territory. The water beneath the lotus and the bridge symbolise Macau's position as a port and its role played in the territory. The five five-pointed stars echo the design of the flag of the People's Republic of China, symbolising the relationship Macau has with its sovereign state.

According to the Basic Law of Macau, the Macau Regional Flag is a green flag with five stars, lotus flower, bridge and sea water. This law also adopted "Apart from displaying the Flag of the People's Republic of China, the Macao Special Administrative Region may also use a regional flag".

1993 proposals 

In 1993, several proposed designs were put forward.
 Similar to the current flag of Macau, but the lotus is stylised differently and is found in a disc, with the stars inside the flower
 A tricolour of red-white-red; the middle band has a depiction of St. Paul's Cathedral in Macau
 A triband with a stylised "M" standing for Macau; a large star above four smaller stars representative of China
 A vertical bicolour of green and red, resembling the Flag of Portugal, with a stylised lotus flower in the lower fly
 A red and blue stylised "M" with a large five-pointed star, with a red lotus blossom within the centre of the star, on the upper fly of a white flag with two blue horizontal bands
 Similar to the current flag of Macau, but the flag colour is red, and the emblem excludes the bridge and water underneath the lotus on the current flag
 A stylised lotus flower with an arch of yellow stars on a red flag
 A stylised lotus flower with an arch of yellow stars above the flower on a red flag
 A depiction of the Guia Fortress Lighthouse, the oldest in Asia, under a golden star; a white halo ring forms around the lighthouse, and two light cones divide the upper fly (red in colour) and lower fly (blue in colour)
 A vertical bicolour of green and red, resembling the Flag of Portugal, with a white gull in the upper fly and a white depiction of the Gov. Nobre de Carvalho Bridge in the lower fly
 A stylised lotus flower on a red flag with an arch of yellow stars above the flower
 A red triangle with base on hoist and apex on the fly edge, filled with the stars from the flag of China
 A stylised lotus flower, with a red-outlined star within the top petal
 Another depiction of the Gov. Nobre de Carvalho Bridge in the lower fly on a red flag, with the five yellow stars running parallel to the outline of the bridge

Color scheme

Portuguese rule
Prior to the handover of Macau to the People's Republic of China by the Portuguese Republic in 1999, Macau officially used only the Portuguese flag, in contrast to Hong Kong, which, under British rule, used a defaced Blue Ensign as its flag, alongside the Union Jack. In 1967, there were proposals to give each overseas province its own flag, consisting of the Portuguese flag with the local coat of arms, but none was ever adopted.

There was a flag for the Government of Macau, with the colony's coat of arms on a light blue field.

There was a flag for the Portuguese-ruled Municipal Council of Macau, with a Portuguese-style coat of arms and two angels as heraldic supporters, which was used at the 1999 handover ceremony as well as the 1990, 1994 and 1998 Asian Games.

Macau historical flags

Gallery

See also 
 Emblem of Macau
 List of Chinese flags
 Flag of Hong Kong
 Flag of the People's Republic of China
 National anthem of the People's Republic of China

References

External links

Macau Handover Ceremony 1999
Lei n.º 6/1999 Utilização e Protecção da Bandeira e do Emblema Regionais
Regulamento Administrativo n.º 5/2019 Disposições concretas relativas à utilização das Bandeiras e Emblemas Nacionais e Regionais e à execução instrumental e vocal do Hino Nacional

Culture of Macau
Macau
Macau